Brian Bateman (born February 25, 1973) is an American professional golfer, who played on the PGA Tour.

Bateman was born in Monroe, Louisiana. He played collegiately at Louisiana State University (LSU) where he graduated in 1996 with a degree in marketing. He turned professional in 1996.

Bateman played on the Nationwide Tour from 1997 to 2001 and 2010 to 2011, winning once.

Bateman played on the PGA Tour from 2002 to 2009 after finishing T-32 at Q-school in 2001. He got his only win on the PGA Tour in 2007 at the Buick Open. After a poor 2009 season Bateman lost his PGA Tour playing rights. He is now an analyst for PGA Tour Live, which provides live streaming coverage of featured groups during rounds one and two of most non-major tournaments.

Bateman lives on St. Simons Island, Georgia with his wife and son.

Professional wins (2)

PGA Tour wins (1)

Nike Tour wins (1)

Nike Tour playoff record (0–1)

Results in major championships

CUT = missed the half-way cut
"T" = Tied
Note: Bateman never played in the U.S. Open or The Open Championship.

Results in The Players Championship

CUT = missed the halfway cut
"T" indicates a tie for a place

Results in World Golf Championships

"T" = Tied

See also
2001 PGA Tour Qualifying School graduates
2002 PGA Tour Qualifying School graduates
2003 PGA Tour Qualifying School graduates
2005 PGA Tour Qualifying School graduates
2006 PGA Tour Qualifying School graduates

External links

American male golfers
LSU Tigers golfers
PGA Tour golfers
Golfers from Louisiana
Sportspeople from Monroe, Louisiana
1973 births
Living people